SBW may refer to:

 A series of aircraft manufactured by Canadian Car and Foundry
 SBW (software), a distributed workbench for systems biology modeling
 Sonny Bill Williams (born 1985), New Zealand rugby international and heavyweight boxer
 IATA designation for Sibu Airport
 ICAO designation for Snowbird Airlines
 MRT station abbreviation for Sembawang MRT station, Singapore